Chester Greenough Atkins (born April 14, 1948) is an American politician who served four terms as a member of the United States House of Representatives from 1985 to 1993. He is a Democrat from Massachusetts.

Biography 
Born in Geneva, Switzerland in 1948, he graduated from Concord-Carlisle High School in 1966 and Antioch College in 1970.

Political career 
Atkins began his political career in the Massachusetts House of Representatives where he served from 1970 to 1971 and later served in the Massachusetts Senate from 1972 to 1984.

Congress 
When James Shannon vacated Massachusetts' 5th District to run unsuccessfully for the U.S. Senate, Atkins ran for the seat in 1984 and was elected to the Ninety-Ninth and the next three succeeding Congresses. 

Losing renomination in 1992 to Marty Meehan, Atkins left the House in January 1993.

Later career 
He is a member of the ReFormers Caucus of Issue One.

He resides in Hancock, NH with his wife Jessica Stern.

See also
 1973–1974 Massachusetts legislature
 1977–1978 Massachusetts legislature
 Massachusetts Senate's Middlesex and Worcester district

References

External links
 

1948 births
Democratic Party members of the United States House of Representatives from Massachusetts
Living people
Concord-Carlisle High School alumni
Members of Congress who became lobbyists